Inside Neil hamburger is a 2000 EP by alternative comedian Neil Hamburger. It released by Drag City on June 26, 2000.

Track listing

"Interview Snippet" (0:16)
"International Funnyman" (6:31)
"Inspirational Speaker" (0:37)
"Why Did the Cow Feel Inadequate?" (6:31)

References

Gregg Turkington albums
Drag City (record label) albums
2000 EPs